Emil William Andres (February 22, 1911 Tinley Park, Illinois – July 20, 1999 South Holland, Illinois) was an American racecar driver active during the 1930s and 1940s.

Andres was part of the midget car racing "Chicago Gang" with Tony Bettenhausen, Cowboy O'Rourke, Paul Russo, Jimmy Snyder, and Wally Zale. They toured tracks in the Midwest and East Coast of the United States.

Career award
Andres was inducted in the National Sprint Car Hall of Fame in 1996. In 2013, he was inducted in the National Midget Auto Racing Hall of Fame.

Complete AAA Championship Car results

Indianapolis 500 results

Complete Formula One World Championship results
(key)

References

External links
 

1911 births
1999 deaths
People from Tinley Park, Illinois
Racing drivers from Chicago
Racing drivers from Illinois
Indianapolis 500 drivers
National Sprint Car Hall of Fame inductees
AAA Championship Car drivers